The Tamron AF 18-250mm F/3.5-6.3 Di II LD Aspherical (IF) Macro is an interchangeable superzoom lens by Tamron, designed for Canon, Nikon, Pentax and Sony APS-C bodies.

References
http://www.dpreview.com/products/tamron/lenses/tamron_18-250_3p5-6p3_di_ii/specifications

Superzoom lenses
18-250